This is a list of current registered airports in the Australian state of Tasmania.



List of airports
The list is sorted by the name of the community served, click the sort buttons in the table header to switch listing order.  Airports named in bold are Designated International Airports, even if they have limited or no scheduled international services.

Note that some unregistered landing grounds in Tasmania, such as Queenstown Airport, are still listed in international coding systems, usually as private aerodromes.

Notes

See also
List of airports in Australia

 
Tasmania
Airports